Gotthold Gloger (17 June 1924 – 16 October 2001) was a German writer and painter.

Life
Gotthold Gloger was born in Königsberg, East Prussia. He received painting and drawing lessons as a child.  He attended the Kunstgewerbeakademie in Königsberg from 1941, simultaneously arose his first literary attempt.  From 1942, Gloger participated in World War II as a soldier of the Wehrmacht and later belonging to the 999th Light Afrika Division.

After the war, he graduated art studies in Frankfurt am Main and visited as a guest listener of romance studies and philosophy lectures.  In 1947 and 1948, he remained for a long time in Italy and Southern France.  Because of his participation in a strike of the harbor workers in Marseille, he would be arrested and held for a while in a military prison in Strasbourg.  He moved to East Germany in 1954.  He was a student at the Johannes R. Becher Institute of Literature in Leipzig.  Subsequently he lived as a painter and freelance writer until 1967 in Meiningen and from 1970 predominantly in the city quarter of Kraatz, Gransee in Brandenburg. He died there in 2001.

Gotthold Gloger's authored works consist of novels, narratives, children's literature as well as screenplays to television plays.  He had a preference for historical subject matter.  His faithfulness to details and his way with stories would be emphasized by critics.

Gotthold Gloger was a member of the P.E.N. Central of East Germany since 1954.  He received the 1954 Heinrich Mann Prize and the 1961 Children's Book Prize of the Ministerium für Kultur (Ministry of Culture) of East Germany.

Works
Philomela Kleespieß trug die Fahne (Philomela Kleespieß carries the Flag), Berlin 1953
Der Soldat und sein Lieutenant (The Soldier and his Lieutenant), Berlin 1955
Die auf den Herrn warten (She waits for the Men), Berlin 1958
Der dritte Hochzeitstag (The Third Wedding Day), Berlin 1960
Rot wie Rubin (Red like Rubin), Berlin 1961
Der Bauerbacher Bauernschmaus (The Farm's Feast of its Wild Boar), Berlin 1963
Frido, fall nicht runter (Frido, Do not Fall Down), Berlin 1965
Meininger Miniaturen (Meiningen's Miniatures), Berlin 1965
Das Aschaffenburger Kartenspiel (The Card Game of Aschaffenburg), Berlin 1969
Kathrins Donnerstag (Katherin's Thursday), Berlin 1970
Der Mann mit dem Goldhelm (The Man with the Gold Helm), Berlin 1972
Der Bäckerjunge aus Beeskow (The Backer Boy from Beeskow), Berlin 1974
Ritter, Tod und Teufel (Knight, Death and Devil), Berlin 1976
Das Rübenfest und andere Geschichten (The Turnip Feast and Other Histories), Berlin 1979
Berliner Guckkasten (Berlin's Looking Box), Berlin 1980
Freundlich ist die Nacht (Friendly is the Night), Berlin 1980
Leb vergnügt oder Die Ermordung des Hofmarschalls von Minutoli zu Meiningen (Live Cheerful of the Death of the Hope Marschall of Minutoli to Meiningen), Berlin 1981
Meine Feder für den König (My Feather for the King), Berlin 1985

See also
 List of German painters

Literature
Gotthold Gloger, Berlin 1985

External links
Literature by and on Gotthold Gloger in the catalog of the German National Library 
Homepage of Gotthold Gloger 

1924 births
2001 deaths
20th-century German painters
20th-century German male artists
German male painters
Writers from Königsberg
Heinrich Mann Prize winners
German male writers
German Army soldiers of World War II
Artists from Königsberg